Alfonso Sanchez (born 27 July 1974) is an Andorran football player. He has played for Andorra national team.

National team statistics

References

1974 births
Living people
Andorran footballers
Association football goalkeepers
Andorra international footballers